Sullivan County Airport  is a county-owned public-use airport located three nautical miles (6 km) northwest of the central business district of Sullivan, a city in Sullivan County, Indiana, United States. It is included in the FAA's National Plan of Integrated Airport Systems for 2011–2015, which categorized it as a general aviation facility.

Facilities and aircraft 
It has one asphalt paved runway designated 18/36 which measures 4,360 by 75 feet (1,329 x 23 m).

For the 12-month period ending December 31, 2006, the airport had 8,657 aircraft operations, an average of 23 per day: 97% general aviation and 3% air taxi. At that time there were 29 aircraft based at this airport: 97% single-engine and 3% multi-engine.

References

External links 
 Aerial photo from INDOT Airport Directory
 Aerial photo as of 4 March 1999 from USGS The National Map via MSR Maps
 
 

Airports in Indiana
Transportation buildings and structures in Sullivan County, Indiana